Concerto for Constantine is an unsigned Irish indie rock band formed in August 2007. The band consists of former JJ72 frontman Mark Greaney (vocals, guitar), former Turn and Idlewild bassist Gavin Fox (bass) and former The Frames and Bell X1 drummer Paul 'Binzer' Brennan (drums).

Formation 
In the summer of 2007, Mark and Gavin found themselves simultaneously no longer in a band. After approaching Binzer, who the band themselves describe as "the Irish Jimmy Chamberpot", a rehearsal took place in August 2007 and the band was formed.
The name of the band was initially created by Gavin looking through some songs on iTunes. He selected the name 'Concerto' and Mark completed it using a name from a dream.

Notable performances 
Concerto for Constantine played throughout Ireland, during November 2007, on the 11-date 2fm 2moro 2our. The band supported The Smashing Pumpkins in Dublin and in Belfast on 9–10 February. They played their very first headlining show in Fibber Magees on 22 February 2008. The band were due to play two dates in London at the end of March.

Concerto for Constantine opened the Green Room at Oxegen 2008 on 12 July, performing before Delays and The Brian Jonestown Massacre.

Future releases 
Concerto for Constantine recorded the song "Minsk" and are releasing it as a single with a video. It has since appeared as a free download online. The band also plan to make an album.

References

External links 
 official site
Concerto for Constantine (official Myspace)
Interview With Concerto for Constantine (Drop-D.ie)
Brief History of Concerto for Constantine 2007 -2008 (Tickets There at Wordpress.com)

Musical groups from Dublin (city)
Musical groups established in 2007